The Sunset Trail is a 1932 American Western film directed by B. Reeves Eason.

Plot summary

Cast 
 Ken Maynard - Jim Brandon
 Ruth Hiatt - Molly Mason
 Frank Rice - Taterbug
 Philo McCullough - Joe Weller - Banker
 Buddy Hunter - Buddy
 Richard Alexander - One-Shot - Henchman

References

External links 
 
 
 
 
 

1932 Western (genre) films
American black-and-white films
American Western (genre) films
1932 films
Tiffany Pictures films
Films directed by B. Reeves Eason
1930s American films
1930s English-language films